The March against Homophobia and Transphobia is an LGBT pride parade and LGBT demonstration held annually in Turkey's capital, Ankara. The event first took place in 2003 and now occurs each year on either the last Sunday of June or the first Sunday of July, to mark the end of Ankara pride week.

Participants assemble in Cebeci. This is a wide pedestrianized boulevard and one of Ankara's most important public spaces, the frequent home of bayram and regional festivals.

Organizers 

 Kaos GL

See also

 LGBT rights in Turkey

References

External links

 Homofobi ve Transfobi Karşıtı Yürüyüş İzlenimleri, Kaos GL 
 Homofobi ve Transfobi Karşıtı Yürüyüş! (18 May), Kaos GL

2003 establishments in Turkey
Annual events in Turkey
LGBT events in Turkey
Festivals in Ankara
May events
July events
June events
LGBT culture in Turkey
LGBT organizations in Turkey
Pride parades
Recurring events established in 2003
Summer events in Turkey